The Hillcrest Round Table, or "Comedian's Round Table", was a group of Jewish comedians who met daily at a particular round table at the Men's Grill of the Hillcrest Country Club in Los Angeles.  The group included (from oldest to youngest):

 Al Jolson         1886–1950
 Chico Marx	1887–1961
 Harpo Marx	1888–1964
 Groucho Marx	1890–1977
 Eddie Cantor	1892–1964
 Gummo Marx	1892–1977
 Lou Holtz	1893–1980
 Jack Benny	1894–1974
 George Burns	1896–1996
 George Jessel	1898–1981
 Zeppo Marx	1901–1979
 Al Ritz	1901–1965
 Jimmy Ritz	1904–1985
 Harry Ritz	1907–1986
 Milton Berle	1908–2002
 Danny Kaye	1911–1987

Arthur Marx wrote, In the heyday of the Round Table, in the '40s, '50s and '60s, it was probably the most amusing place to lunch in all the world. Imagine sitting at a table with that group, each one trying to out-funny the other, and all but Harpo, Chico and Danny Kaye puffing on long, fragrant Havanas. If you didn't die laughing, you could have choked on the smoke."

Each comedian had to have an actual membership in the country club.  George Burns, the penultimate surviving member, was also one of the first in the group to join.  His original membership fee was $300.

With Milton Berle's death in 2002, all members had died.

References

Jewish American comedians